Zaw Min is a Burmese name and may refer to:

 Zaw Min (minister), former Minister for Electric Power-1 of Myanmar and a retired Colonel
 Zaw Min (MP), Burmese politician currently serving as a House of Nationalities MP
 Zaw Min Tun (born 1992), Burmese footballer